Alvin Obinna Okoro (born 26 March 2005) is a professional Nigerian football player who plays as a left-winger for the squad of the  club Venezia.

Club career
After coming through the youth ranks of Pordenone, Okoro made his professional debut for the club on 18 April 2022, coming in as a substitute for Leonardo Candellone at the 62nd minute of the Serie B game against Benevento: at 17 years and 23 days, he became the youngest player to feature in a league match during the 2021-22 season.

On 1 September 2022, Okoro officially joined Venezia on a permanent deal.

References

External links
 

2005 births
Living people
Nigerian footballers
Association football forwards
Pordenone Calcio players
Venezia F.C. players
Serie B players
Nigerian expatriate footballers
Expatriate footballers in Italy
Nigerian expatriate sportspeople in Italy